Modern Logistics is a Brazilian cargo airline based in Jundiaí. It was established in 2015.

History

Modern Logistics was founded in 2015. In May 2017 it acquired an active AOC and commenced operations.

Destinations

Fleet
Modern Logistics fleet consists of the following aircraft (as of April 2021):

See also
List of airlines of Brazil

References

External links

Airlines of Brazil
Airlines established in 2015
2015 establishments in Brazil
Companies of Brazil